Lara Super Thermal Power Station is a coal-fired power project located near village Lara, Taluk Pussore, Raigarh district in Indian state of Chhattisgarh. The power plant is one of the coal based power plants of NTPC. The coal requirement will be obtained from Talaipalli coal block Mand Raigarh Coalfield and water requirement will be sourced from Mahanadi River through Saradih Barrage.

Capacity
Lara Super Thermal Power Project has an installed capacity of 1600 MW.

References

External links
Prime Minister to dedicate NTPC's Chhattisgarh power plant to nation

Coal-fired power stations in Chhattisgarh
2019 establishments in Chhattisgarh
Energy infrastructure completed in 2019